The Atlantic Coast Line Railroad's Perry Cutoff (which was part of the company's Thomasville—Dunnellon Line) was a historic rail line in northern Florida running from Monticello southeast to Perry.  The line provided a shortcut for rail traffic running between the Midwest and the Tampa Bay area by providing a more direct route and a bypass for the busy rail hub in Jacksonville.  It was completed in 1928 to reduce travel times for its passenger trains to the west coast, or Gulf Coast, of Florida during the Florida land boom of the 1920s.

Route and history
The Perry Cutoff basically connected two pre-existing Atlantic Coast Line Railroad routes.  Track to Monticello, which originated in Thomasville, Georgia, was built in 1888 as a branch of the Savannah, Florida and Western Railroad.  The Savannah, Florida and Western Railroad was once the main line of the Plant System.

At the other end, track was built in 1907 by the Atlantic Coast Line from Newberry west to Wilcox and Perry.  This was an extension of the Jacksonville and Southwestern Railroad, a railroad from Jacksonville to Newberry that the Atlantic Coast Line acquired in 1904.  The Atlantic Coast Line additionally built a line from Dunnellon northwest to Wilcox in 1914 to connect with the Newberry to Perry Line.

Once the Perry Cutoff was in place in 1928, trains could travel from the midwest to Thomasville, Georgia and head south along Florida's Gulf Coast through Monticello, Perry, Wilcox, and Dunnellon to reach Tampa and St. Petersburg.  The line allowed for trains to travel up to 59 miles per hour.  Most notably, the Louisville & Nashville's and ACL's Southland was shifted over to this direct route in 1928. The Line crossed the Seaboard Air Line Railroad's Jacksonville to Tallahassee line in Drifton.  It also connected with the Live Oak, Perry, and Gulf Railroad in Perry, which the Atlantic Coast Line owned until 1928 (the year the Perry Cutoff was complete) when it was sold to the Brooks-Scanlon Lumber Company, who would eventually sell it to Norfolk Southern.  Once the Perry Cutoff was in place, the full line from Thomasville to Dunnellon was designated on employee timetables as the Thomasville–Dunnellon Line (ND Line).

The Atlantic Coast Line became the Seaboard Coast Line Railroad in 1967.  The Seaboard Coast Line continued to operate the full line from Thomasville to Dunnellon as the Perry Subdivision.  In 1980, the Seaboard Coast Line's parent company merged with the Chessie System, creating the CSX Corporation. The CSX Corporation initially operated the Chessie and Seaboard Systems separately until 1986, when they were merged into CSX Transportation.

Remnants
Most of the Perry Cutoff north of Cross City was removed by the mid 1980s along with track from Dunnellon to Chiefland.   Remaining track from Newberry to Cross City, and from Wilcox to Chiefland was then leased to the Florida West Coast Railroad, a shortline, in 1987.  The Florida West Coast Railroad slowly abandoned more of the track until 2010, when the last track west of Newberry was abandoned.  The Nature Coast State Trail now runs on some of the former right of way.

The only track that is still active is what is now CSX's Metcalf Spur from Thomasville to Metcalf (part of the former Monticello Branch).

Historic stations
Thomasville to Dunnellon

See also
High Springs—Lakeland Line
Jacksonville and Southwestern Railroad

References

Atlantic Coast Line Railroad
Defunct Florida railroads
Railroad cutoffs